"Ain't That Enough" is a song recorded by Scottish rock band Teenage Fanclub. The song was released on 30 June 1997 through Creation Records, as the lead single from the band's sixth studio album Songs from Northern Britain. The song was written and sung by vocalist and bassist Gerard Love. AllMusic biographer Matt Collar writes that the song touches on themes of "nature, romantic fidelity, and the passing of time."

The song peaked at number 17 on the UK Singles Chart, representing the band's best chart performance domestically.

Reception
Paste writer Ben Salmon placed the song in the top spot of his 2018 ranking of the band's best songs, calling it a "masterwork of '90s electric guitar tone, a clinic on melody making and harmony singing, and a lesson about optimizing our limited time here on Earth [...] "Ain't That Enough" is an ecstatic exhale of a song bathed in sunlight."

Charts

References

1997 singles
1997 songs
Creation Records singles
Jangle pop songs